The Sikorsky S-64 Skycrane is an American twin-engine heavy-lift helicopter. It is the civil version of the United States Army's CH-54 Tarhe. It is currently produced as the S-64 Aircrane by Erickson Inc.

Development

Under Sikorsky 

The Sikorsky S-64 was designed as an enlarged version of the prototype flying crane helicopter, the Sikorsky S-60. The S-64 had a six-blade main rotor and was powered by two  Pratt & Whitney JFTD12A turboshaft engines. The prototype S-64 first flew on 9 May 1962 and was followed by two further examples for evaluation by the German armed forces. The Germans did not place an order, but the United States Army placed an initial order for six S-64A helicopters (with the designation YCH-54A Tarhe). Seven S-64E variants were built by Sikorsky for the civil market.

Under Erickson 
Originally a Sikorsky Aircraft product, the type certificate and manufacturing rights were purchased from them by Erickson Air-Crane in 1992. Since that time, Erickson Air-Crane has become the manufacturer and world's largest operator of S-64 Aircranes and has made over 1,350 changes to the airframe, instrumentation, and payload capabilities of the helicopter. The Aircrane can be fitted with a  fixed retardant tank to assist in the control of bush fires, and it has proven itself admirably in this role.

S-64 Aircranes have been sold to the Italian and Korean Forest Services for fire suppression and emergency response duties. Those in the Erickson Air-Crane fleet are leased worldwide to organizations, companies, and Federal Government agencies for either short-term or longer term use in fire suppression, civil protection, heavy lift construction, and timber harvesting. Erickson is manufacturing new S-64s, as well as remanufacturing existing CH-54s.

Erickson gives each of its S-64s an individual name, the best-known being "Elvis", used in fighting fires in Australia alongside "The Incredible Hulk" and "Isabelle". Other operators, such as Siller Brothers, have followed with their Sikorsky S-64E, Andy's Pride. The Erickson S-64E nicknamed "Olga" was used to lift the top section of the CN Tower into place in Toronto, Ontario, Canada.

Variants

Sikorsky Skycrane 

S-64
Twin-engined heavy-lift helicopter, 3 built. 1 rebuilt as S-64E.
S-64A
Six test and evaluation helicopters for the US Army.

S-64B 
Civil version of CH-54A, 7 built.

Erickson 
S-64E
Upgraded CH-54A helicopters, plus one new build aircraft; 17 aircraft in total.
S-64F
Upgraded CH-54B helicopters; powered by two Pratt & Whitney JFTD12-5A engines; 13 aircraft in total.
S-64F+
Proposed upgraded version with new engines, avionics, and optional piloting.

Operators 

 Corpo Nazionale dei Vigili del Fuoco

 Korea Forest Service (6 in service)

 Columbia Helicopters (no longer in use)
 Erickson Air-Crane
 Evergreen Helicopters, Inc. (bought by Erickson Air-Crane)
 Helicopter Transport Services
 Los Angeles City Fire Department (contracted by Erickson Air-Crane)
 Los Angeles County Fire Department (contracted by Erickson Air-Crane)
 San Diego Gas and Electric (contracted by Erickson Air-Crane)
 Siller Helicopters

Incidents 
 N189AC "Gypsy Lady" – crashed in Ojai, California on 1 October 2006. While operating for the USFS, the Erickson S-64 snagged a dip tank and the helicopter rolled over and crashed.
 N198AC "Shirley Jean" – S-64F; sold to European Air-Crane c.2006 as I-SEAD; crashed in Italy on 2007-04-26. Aircraft was destroyed in a post-crash fire.
 N248AC "Aurora" – S-64E; named after Aurora State Airport, home to Columbia Helicopters, former owner of aircraft. Crashed on 26 August 2004 in Corsica, killing its Canadian pilot and French co-pilot. The aircrane was chartered by the interior ministry to fight fires on the French Mediterranean island of Corsica. It had been fighting a wildfire as it went down near the village of Ventiseri, trying to return to a nearby military base, due to technical problems associated with inflight breakup.
 N173AC "Christine" – S-64E; ditched into a small dam within Melbourne's water catchment with no casualties during a firefighting operation in Gippsland, Victoria, Australia on 28 January 2019. The crew, consisting of 2 pilots and the flight engineer, were able to bail from the aircraft in 2-3m of water and swim to safety with no life-threatening injuries.  The aircraft was rebuilt at Erickson's Central Point, Oregon facility and flew again in early 2021.

Specifications (S-64E)

See also

Notes

References

External links 

 Erickson Air-Crane website
 Canadian Air-Crane website
 Air Tanker Listing
 FAA Type Certificate Data Sheet
 CN Tower antenna being lifted into place – footage 1975

1960s United States helicopters
S-064 Skycrane
Twin-turbine helicopters
Aircraft first flown in 1962
Modular aircraft